Mala (Bad or Evil) is a 2013 Argentine crime film directed by Adrián Caetano and starring Ana Celentano, Brenda Gandini, Florencia Raggi, Juana Viale, Julián Krakov, Liz Solari, María Duplaá and Rafael Ferro. The plot revolves around Rosario, an assassin who only kills men who mistreat or abuse women.

Cast
 Florencia Raggi as Rosario (II)
 Juana Viale as Angélica
 Liz Solari as Rosario (I)
 María Duplaa as Rosario (III)
 Brenda Gandini as Rosario (IV)
 Rafael Ferro as Rodrigo
 Ana Celentano as María
 Julián Krakov as Carlos Javier
 Arturo Goetz 
 Daniel Valenzuela 
 Susana Pampín 
 Laura Espínola 
 Rubén Noceda 
 Rogelio Gracia 
 Erasmo Olivera 
 Alejandro Ciancio

References

External links
 

2013 crime films
2013 films
2010s Spanish-language films
Argentine crime films
2010s Argentine films